("The noble heart"), WAB 65, is a song composed by Anton Bruckner in  during his stay in St. Florian.

History 
Bruckner composed this work on a text of Ernst Marinelli in  during his stay in St. Florian. He composed it for the name day of Johann Nepomuk Paulitsch, a member of the St. Florian choir. It is not known whether the work was performed during Bruckner's life.

The original manuscript, which became in-between lost, was found in the legacy of Bruckner's friend Rudolf Weinwurm. A sketch of it is archived at the Abbey of St. Florian. It was performed in 1988 by the Wagner Society Male Choir, Keio University, Tokyo, and, thereafter, in 1994 in the Connecticut College.

Bruckner composed a second setting on the same text for mixed choir (WAB 66) in 1857.

Text 
Das edle Herz uses a text by Ernst Marinelli.

Music 

Discography 
There is as yet no commercial recording of this first setting of Das edle Herz.

References

Sources 
 August Göllerich, Anton Bruckner. Ein Lebens- und Schaffens-Bild,  – posthumous edited by Max Auer by G. Bosse, Regensburg, 1932
 Anton Bruckner – Sämtliche Werke, Band XXIII/2:  Weltliche Chorwerke (1843–1893), Musikwissenschaftlicher Verlag der Internationalen Bruckner-Gesellschaft, Angela Pachovsky and Anton Reinthaler (Editor), Vienna, 1989
 Cornelis van Zwol, Anton Bruckner 1824–1896 – Leven en werken, uitg. Thoth, Bussum, Netherlands, 2012. 
 Uwe Harten, Anton Bruckner. Ein Handbuch. , Salzburg, 1996. .

External links 
 
 Das edle Herz A-Dur, WAB 65 – Critical discography by Hans Roelofs 
 The performance of Das edle Herz, WAB 65 by the Wagner Society Male Choir of Japan, 11 December 1988, can be heard on YouTube: Das edle Herz, WAB 65

Weltliche Chorwerke by Anton Bruckner
1851 compositions
Compositions in A major